Caer Caradoc (Chapel Lawn) (Welsh – Caer Caradog) is an Iron Age hill fort and Scheduled Monument in the south-west of the English county of Shropshire, near the town of Clun. It overlooks the village of Chapel Lawn. It is located within an area of Open Access land and can be reached via a public footpath between the farms of Wax Hall to the west and Bryncambric to the east.

This hill fort has the same name as another, Caer Caradoc near Church Stretton, also in Shropshire but  to the north-east.

References

Hill forts in Shropshire
Tourist attractions in Shropshire
Clun